Calamotropha torpidellus is a moth in the family Crambidae. It was described by Zeller in 1852. It is found in South Africa.

References

Endemic moths of South Africa
Crambinae
Moths described in 1852